Club Deportivo Juvenil Tamarite is a Spanish football team based in Tamarite de Litera, in the autonomous community of Aragon. Founded in 1960, it plays in Tercera División – Group 17, holding home matches at Estadio La Colomina.

Season to season

13 seasons in Tercera División

References

External links

Soccerway team profile

Football clubs in Aragon
Association football clubs established in 1961
1961 establishments in Spain